Otis Day and the Knights was created as a fictional R&B band to perform in the 1978 movie National Lampoon's Animal House.

Career
They are best known for their R&B/ black rock version of "Shout" and "Shama Lama Ding Dong". Both songs were sung by Lloyd Williams (singer), and lip synched by DeWayne Jessie in the film. Backing vocals were provided by Melvin Britt and Sidney Justin. Gospel style "Shout" was written by the Isley Brothers. Otis Day was played by Jessie, brother of Young Jessie of The Coasters. Robert Cray was one of the members of the band, seen playing bass in the movie.

In the 1980s, DeWayne Jessie purchased the rights to the band's name from Universal Studios and formed a real-life version of the band with some of his family members and toured the country for years afterward, with Jessie essentially assuming the identity of Otis Day. They recorded an album, produced by George Clinton, that came out in 1989 titled Shout which flopped, but included updated versions of "Shout" and "Shama Lama Ding Dong".

Discography
Shout (1989)

References

External links

Fictional musical groups